Emil Koparanov (born 14 June 1983) is a Bulgarian football defender.

References

External links
Profile at Guardian's Stats Centre
Profile at sportal.bg

Bulgarian footballers
1983 births
Living people
Association football defenders
FC Etar 1924 Veliko Tarnovo players
PFC Chernomorets Burgas players
FC Pomorie players
FC Montana players
FC Lyubimets players
PFC Dobrudzha Dobrich players
PFC Akademik Svishtov players
First Professional Football League (Bulgaria) players